The Battle of Chemnitz (14 April 1639) took place near the town of Chemnitz, in what is now eastern Germany, during the Thirty Years' War. Swedish forces under Johan Banér inflicted a crushing defeat on Rodolfo Giovanni Marazzino who commanded the Saxons and an Imperial detachment.

Background
After the Swedish position in South and Middle Germany was shattered by their defeat at Nördlingen 1634, they were abandoned by most of their German allies in the Peace of Prague and faced difficulties to regain their strength. Hopes raised by the victory at Wittstock against an Imperial-Saxon army in 1636 were overturned by an Imperial counteroffensive in 1637 that repulsed the Swedes back to Pomerania. Over most of the year 1638, the Swedes were enclosed in a few coastal fortresses behind a cordon raised by the Imperial commander Matthias Gallas. However, while the Swedes under Banér were supplied and reinforced by the sea, the Imperials received little support by their allies Brandenburg and Saxony and were unable to consistently sustain their army in the region. Since Gallas was pushed back to Mecklenburg by Banér in autumn 1638 and the neighbouring Lower Saxon Circle denied him suitable Winter quarters, he retreated with his army to Bohemia.

In early 1639, Banér seized the opportunity of Gallas' retreat and crossed the Elbe with the Swedish army. He went through Lüneburg that provided him with supplies but chose to stay neutral along with the entire Lower Saxon Circle. To keep his army intact and to make progress against the Emperor, Banér had to traverse the devastated area and decided to attack Saxony with 18,000 men. He faced unexpected little resistance, taking Zwickau and Chemnitz in quick succession. Only when he attacked Freiberg, the silver mine of the Saxon Elector, the garrison vigorously resisted. Banér lost 500 men in an unsuccessful assault. When the Saxon army under Marazzino approached Freiberg with 5,000 men, Banér abandoned the siege and fell back to Chemnitz.

Battle
Marazzino made the mistake of chasing the Swedish besiegers from Freiberg to Chemnitz. Banér turned his forces around and attacked Marazzino's small army. The Swedes were able to rout a large portion of the opposing forces, taking 1,500 prisoners as well as the Saxon artillery.

Aftermath
Following the battle, the Swedes occupied Pirna and advanced into Bohemia.

Notes

References

1639 in Europe
Chemnitz 1639
Chemnitz 1639
Chemnitz 1639
History of Chemnitz
Chemnitz
Chemnitz